Majhighariani Institute of Technology and Science (or MITS) is located in Rayagada, Odisha, India. It was started in 1999 by the Basantdevi Charitable Trust. Its name came from the Goddess Majhighariani, deity of Rayagada. The college was approved by the All India Council for Technical Education (AICTE) and the  government of Odisha. The college is affiliated to Biju Patnaik University of Technology (BPUT), Rourkela and Berhampur University. It is an ISO 9001:2008 certified institute of eastern India.

Location
The campus is 15 km from Rayagada on the State Highway. It is around 4.4 KM away from JayKaypur.

Trust
The redoubtable Basanta Devi Charitable Trust derives its name from the venerable Late Smt. Basanta Devi, mother of Sri Balakrishna Panda & Sri Subash Chandra Panda, its chief architects, Managing Trustee & Founder Trustee respectively.

History

Majhighariani Institute Of Technology & Science, Rayagada  was started in  1999 under the patronage of Basanta Devi Charitable Trust in the memory of the Panda family.   Started in a modest campus at Bhakuruguda on the way from Rayagada to Jaykaypur, MITS has developed into a campus of fifty acres at Bhujbal.  It drew its name from the Goddess Majhighariani, the reigning deity of Rayagada.

It has planned buildings, which includes multi-storeyed main building housing classrooms, laboratories, library, seminar hall, examination hall, offices, etc. and 8 sloping roofed but permanent structures housing duty laboratories, drawing hall, canteen, auditorium, etc. It has also a playground and a Gayatri Temple in the campus.   MITS Boys Hostel is in the campus whereas the Girls Hostel is in the Rayagada Town.

Having started with a mere three disciplines of engineering at B.Tech level, it now has ECE, EEE, CSE, IT, BIOTECH, ME, CE, EE. MITS is the 1st institution to have started the B.Tech course in Biotechnology in the entire state of Orissa. It added M.Sc. Course in Biotechnology and Microbiology, Industrial Biotechnology and Bioinformatics & M.Tech Course in Electronic Information System.  Recently, it entered into the area of Industrial Biotechnology. Having envisaged to state a Bio-Diesel Project, it is now prompting and spreading cultivation of Jatropha plants in large areas of Orissa.

Courses offerings

B.Tech 
 Biotechnology
 Computer Science
 Electronics & Communication
 Electrical & Electronics
 Electrical
 Information Technology
 Mechanical
 Civil

M.Tech 
 Biotechnology
 Computer Science
 Electronics & Information System
 Industrial Engineering

M.Sc 
 Biotechnology
 Industrial Biotechnology
 Microbiology
 Bioinformatics
 Computer Science
Telecommunication Engineering

Bachelor in Computer Applications

B.Sc. Biotechnology (Hons.)

Departments
Department of Basic Science & Humanities
Department of Engg. Mathematics
Department of Engg. Physics
Department of Engg. Chemistry
Department of Communicative English
Department of Management Studies
Department of Biotechnology
Department of Civil Engineering,
Department of Computer Science & Engineering and Information Technology,
Department of Electronics & Communication Engineering,
Department of Electrical & Electronics Engineering,
Department of Mechanical Engineering

References

External links
 Official website

All India Council for Technical Education
Engineering colleges in Odisha
Colleges affiliated with Biju Patnaik University of Technology
Education in Rayagada district
Educational institutions established in 1999
1999 establishments in Orissa